Oamaru was a parliamentary electorate in the Otago region of New Zealand, during three periods between 1866 and 1978.

Population centres
The previous electoral redistribution was undertaken in 1875 for the 1875–1876 election. In the six years since, New Zealand's European population had increased by 65%. In the 1881 electoral redistribution, the House of Representatives increased the number of European representatives to 91 (up from 84 since the 1875–76 election). The number of Māori electorates was held at four. The House further decided that electorates should not have more than one representative, which led to 35 new electorates being formed, and two electorates that had previously been abolished to be recreated, including Oamaru. This necessitated a major disruption to existing boundaries.

Through an amendment in the Electoral Act in 1965, the number of electorates in the South Island was fixed at 25, an increase of one since the 1962 electoral redistribution. It was accepted that through the more rapid population growth in the North Island, the number of its electorates would continue to increase, and to keep proportionality, three new electorates were allowed for in the 1967 electoral redistribution for the next election. In the North Island, five electorates were newly created and one electorate was reconstituted while three electorates were abolished. In the South Island, three electorates were newly created and one electorate (Oamaru) was reconstituted while three electorates were abolished. The overall effect of the required changes was highly disruptive to existing electorates, with all but three electorates having their boundaries altered.

The electorate was centred on the town of Oamaru.

History
The electorate existed three times: from 1866 to 1870, 1881 to 1957, and then from 1969 to 1978.

Robert Campbell was the first representative, who served from the 1866 general election to 9 April 1869, when he resigned. Charles Christie Graham won the resulting 1869 by-election; he retired at the end of the term in 1870. The electorate was abolished at the end of the 4th Parliament.

Samuel Shrimski won the 1881 general election in the reconstituted electorate against James Hassell, one of the pioneers of Oamaru. In the 1884 general election, he defeated Viscount Reidhaven (who later became the Earl of Seafield when he succeeded his father). Shrimski resigned on 28 March 1885 and was appointed to the Legislative Council on 15 May 1885.

Thomas William Hislop won the 1885 by-election. Hislop represented the electorate until 5 September 1889, when he resigned. He won the resulting 1889 by-election, but was defeated by Thomas Young Duncan at the 1890 general election.

Members of Parliament
The electorate was represented by twelve Members of Parliament.

Key

Election results

1975 election

1972 election

1969 election

1954 election

1951 election

1949 election

1946 election

1943 election

1938 election

1935 election

1931 election

1928 election

1923 by-election

1902 election

1899 election

1893 election

1890 election

1889 by-election

1885 by-election

1884 election

1881 election

Notes

References

Historical electorates of New Zealand
Oamaru
1865 establishments in New Zealand
1870 disestablishments in New Zealand
1881 establishments in New Zealand
1957 disestablishments in New Zealand
1978 disestablishments in New Zealand
1969 establishments in New Zealand
Politics of Otago